Larry Kwak is an American cancer researcher who works at City of Hope in Duarte, California and is the Director of the Toni Stephenson Lymphoma Center at City of Hope. Dr. Kwak formerly worked at the University of Texas MD Anderson Cancer Center. He was included on Time's list of 2010's most influential people.

Early career 
Dr. Kwak graduated from the 6-year combined B.S./M.D. Honors Program in Medical Education from Northwestern University Medical School in 1982 and earned his Ph.D. in tumor cell biology there in 1984. He then completed a residency in internal medicine and a fellowship in medical oncology at Stanford University Medical Center in California.

Thereafter, he served as Head of the Vaccine Biology Section, Experimental Transplantation and Immunology Branch, at the National Cancer Institute (NCI) from 1992 to 2004. His NCI laboratory is credited with the pioneering bench-to-clinic development of a therapeutic cancer vaccine for B-cell malignancies, which was recently reported as positive in a landmark national Phase III clinical trial. This was one of three recently positive Phase III clinical trials of cancer immunotherapy.

From 2004 to 2014, Dr. Kwak served as Chairman of the Department of Lymphoma and Myeloma and Co-Director of the Center for Cancer Immunology Research at M.D. Anderson Cancer Center.

City of Hope 

In 2010 Dr. Kwak was named to the TIME100, one of the world's 100 most influential people by TIME magazine, for his 20-year commitment to the science of cancer immunotherapy, and in 2016 he was awarded the Ho-Am Prize in Medicine.

Dr. Kwak is the Director of the Toni Stephenson Lymphoma Center and the Dr. Michael Friedman Professor for Translational Medicine at City of Hope.

Honors and awards
 Lady Tata Memorial Trust Postgraduate Award, London, England, 1983
 Physicians Research Training Fellowship, American Cancer Society, New York, 1984
 Young Investigator Award, American Society of Clinical Oncology, 1989
 Asian and Pacific Islander-American Organization Outstanding Scientific Achievement Award, National Institutes of Health (NIH), 2000
 Elected to American Society for Clinical Investigation (ASCI), 2003
 NCI Technology Transfer Award, Center for Cancer Research, 2003
 Team Science Award recipient, International Society for the Biological Therapy of Cancer, 2010
 TIME 100 (Named by TIME magazine as one of the 100 most influential persons in the world), 2010
 Chang-Yul Oh Memorial Award, Korean American Medical Association, 2011
 Faculty Achievement Award in Clinical Research, MD Anderson Cancer Center, 2012
 Proclamation declaring October 26 as Dr. Larry Kwak day, Mayor, City of Houston, Texas, 2013
 Elected to Association of American Physicians (AAP), 2016
 Ho-Am Prize in Medicine, Seoul, South Korea, 2016

References

External links
 https://www.cityofhope.org/people/kwak-larry

Living people
University of Texas MD Anderson Cancer Center faculty
Year of birth missing (living people)
Recipients of the Ho-Am Prize in Medicine